Watsonisuchus is an extinct genus of temnospondyl amphibian from the Early Triassic of Australia, Madagascar, and South Africa. It was up to 122 cm long and had a robust skull of 24 cm in length.

References

 Dragons in the Dust: The Paleobiology of the Giant Monitor Lizard Megalania by Ralph E. Molnar  (Pg. 39)

Triassic temnospondyls of Africa
Prehistoric amphibians of Australia
Capitosaurs
Triassic temnospondyls of Australia
Early Triassic amphibians of Africa
Fossil taxa described in 1966
Prehistoric amphibian genera